Love and Champagne is a 1930 German film directed by Robert Land and starring Camilla von Hollay, Iván Petrovich, and Brita Appelgren.

The film's art direction was by Ludwig Reiber.

Cast

References

Bibliography

External links 
 

1930 films
Films of the Weimar Republic
1930s German-language films
Films directed by Robert Land
Bavaria Film films
German black-and-white films
1930s German films